SS Medina may refer to:

 , an ocean liner for Peninsular and Oriental Steam Navigation Company; sunk by German submarine  on 28 April 1917
 , an ocean liner for the Mallory Line; renamed Roma (1949), Franca C. (1952), Doulos (1978); opened as a land based hotel ship in 2019

Ship names